Rainer Küchl is an Austrian violinist who was born in Waidhofen an der Ybbs, Austria, 25 August 1950.

Background
He started to play the violin at the age of 11, and was admitted to the University of Music and Performing Arts, Vienna, at the age of 14, where he studied with Franz Samohyl. From 1971 to 2016 he was concertmaster of the Vienna Philharmonic Orchestra and also of the orchestra of the Vienna State Opera.

As a soloist he has worked with some of the world's most famous orchestras and conductors, such as Karl Böhm, Leonard Bernstein, Claudio Abbado,  Riccardo Muti, Carlos Kleiber,Valery Gergiev, and Simon Rattle.

In 1973 he founded the string quartet Küchl Quartett which is now known as the Wiener Musikverein Quartett. Since 1976, the quartet has its own concert series at the Brahmssaal of the Musikverein Vienna.

Rainer Küchl is a professor at the University of Music and Performing Arts Vienna since 1982. Among his pupils were Wolfgang David and Joji Hattori.

Rainer Küchl plays 'The Chaconne' by Antonio Stradivari, Cremona 1725, provided as a loan by Oesterreichische Nationalbank.

Decorations and awards
1973: Mozart Interpretation Prize for solo performances
1978: Mozart Medal of the Mozart Society of Vienna (award of Küchl Quartet)
1985: Gold Medal of the province of Salzburg
1988: Austrian Cross of Honour for Science and Art
1994: Grand Decoration of Honour for Services to the Republic of Austria
2001: Honorary Member of the Vienna State Opera
2010: Order of the Rising Sun, Gold Rays with Neck Ribbon - Contributed to the promotion of the cultural relations and mutual understanding between Japan and the Republic of Austria

Sources

External links
 Rainer Küchl Official Website
 
 

1950 births
Living people
People from Waidhofen an der Ybbs
20th-century Austrian musicians
20th-century Austrian male musicians
21st-century Austrian musicians
20th-century classical violinists
21st-century classical violinists
Austrian violinists
Male classical violinists
Concertmasters of the Vienna Philharmonic
Players of the Vienna Philharmonic
University of Music and Performing Arts Vienna alumni
Recipients of the Order of the Rising Sun, 3rd class
Recipients of the Austrian Cross of Honour for Science and Art
Recipients of the Grand Decoration for Services to the Republic of Austria